"Kameniari", is a poem by Ukrainian poet Ivan Franko (1856–1916). In this poem, slaves bound by chains smash through rock using sledgehammers. The poem is allegorical, describing the twin ideas of liberation from an oppressive past (Polish, Russian and Austro-Hungarian rule of Ukraine) and of the laying down of a highway for future social progress by pioneers.

The eponymous kameniar is a quarry stonecutter, or quarryman. The stone breaker became a revolutionary symbol in Ukrainian and wider soviet culture as well as a metaphorical name for Ivan Franko himself.

See also 
 2428 Kamenyar, an asteroid of an asteroid belt that is classified as a minor planet and was discovered by the Russian astronomer Nikolai Chernykh in 1977 who was working at the Crimean Astrophysical Observatory

Notes and references 

Ukrainian words and phrases
Ivan Franko